Mount Prospect is a village in Elk Grove and Wheeling Townships in Cook County, Illinois, about  northwest of downtown Chicago, and approximately 4 miles north of O'Hare International Airport. As of the 2020 census, the village had a total population of 56,852.

Geography
Mount Prospect is located at  (42.065427, -87.936217).

Climate

According to the Köppen climate classification system, Mount Prospect lies within the Humid continental climate zone (or Dfa) in the warm summer type. The village experiences warm to hot and humid summers and frigid, snowy winters. The village lies within U.S.D.A Hardiness zone 5b, along the fringe of zone 6a.

Demographics
As of the 2020 census there were 56,852 people, 20,855 households, and 15,043 families residing in the village. The racial makeup of the village was 66.37% White, 2.69% African American, 0.68% Native American, 14.49% Asian, 0.05% Pacific Islander, 8.01% from other races, and 7.70% from two or more races. Hispanic or Latino of any race were 16.16% of the population.

There were 20,855 households, out of which 55.24% had children under the age of 18 living with them, 60.11% were married couples living together, 8.05% had a female householder with no husband present, and 27.87% were non-families. 23.61% of all households were made up of individuals, and 11.86% had someone living alone who was 65 years of age or older. The average household size was 3.09 and the average family size was 2.59.

The village's age distribution consisted of 22.9% under the age of 18, 5.3% from 18 to 24, 27.2% from 25 to 44, 26.5% from 45 to 64, and 18.1% who were 65 years of age or older. The median age was 40.8 years. For every 100 females, there were 98.7 males. For every 100 females age 18 and over, there were 94.4 males.

The median income for a household in the village was $84,353, and the median income for a family was $103,946. Males had a median income of $57,695 versus $41,193 for females. The per capita income for the village was $40,452. About 3.7% of families and 5.8% of the population were below the poverty line, including 4.9% of those under age 18 and 8.4% of those age 65 or over.

Note: the US Census treats Hispanic/Latino as an ethnic category. This table excludes Latinos from the racial categories and assigns them to a separate category. Hispanics/Latinos can be of any race.

In 2008, Mount Prospect was voted the best city in which to raise children.

Economy
Companies based in Mount Prospect include Cummins Allison, NTN USA and Rauland-Borg.

The former United Airlines headquarters in Elk Grove Township was annexed into Mount Prospect in the 2010s.

Top employers
According to the Village's 2017 Comprehensive Annual Financial Report, the top employers in the city are:

Education

Mount Prospect has a number of award-winning school districts. It has multiple districts that serve the village. Central Mount Prospect is served by Mount Prospect School District 57. North (and somewhat east) Mount Prospect is served by River Trails School District 26. South (and somewhat west) Mount Prospect is served by Elk Grove Community Consolidated School District 59. A very small portion of northern Mount Prospect in its northernmost point is served by Buffalo Grove-Wheeling Community Consolidated District 21. A small part of north central Mount Prospect is also served by Arlington Heights School District 25. A small part of northwest Mount Prospect is served by Prospect Heights School District 23.

Township High School District 214 serves all of Mount Prospect; the town is served by multiple High Schools. Small numbers of students attend Elk Grove High School and Buffalo Grove High School. Prospect High School is the only one located within the village. The two Catholic parochial schools (K-8) located within Mount Prospect are St. Raymond and St. Emily.

The schools that service Mount Prospect are:

 Mount Prospect District 57
 Westbrook School for Young Learners (PK–1)
 Fairview Elementary School (2–5)
 Lions Park Elementary School (2–5)
 Lincoln Middle School (6–8)

 River Trails District 26
 Euclid Elementary School (K–5)
 Indian Grove Elementary School (K–5)
 River Trails Middle School (6–8)

 Elk Grove Community Consolidated District 59
 Robert Frost Elementary School (K–5)
 Friendship Junior High School (6–8; located in Des Plaines)
 Forest View Elementary School (K–5)
 John Jay Elementary School (K–5)
 Holmes Junior High School (6–8)

 Arlington Heights School District 25
 Windsor Elementary School (K–5; located in Arlington Heights)
 Dryden Elementary School (K–5; located in Arlington Heights)
 South Middle School (6–8; located in Arlington Heights)

 Prospect Heights School District 23
 Betsy Elementary School (2-3; located in Prospect Heights)
 Anne Sullivan Elementary School (3–5; located in Prospect Heights)
 Dwight D. Eisenhower Elementary School (Pre-K-1; located in Prospect Heights)
 MacArthur Middle School (6–8; located in Prospect Heights)

 Buffalo Grove–Wheeling Community Consolidated District 21
  Robert Frost Elementary School (K–5)
  Oliver Holmes Middle School (6–8; located in Wheeling)

 Township High School District 214
 Prospect High School (9–12)
 John Hersey High School (9–12)
 Rolling Meadows High School (9–12)
 Wheeling High School (9–12)
 Buffalo Grove High School (9-12)
 Elk Grove High School (9-12)

 Religious education
 St. Raymond School (K–8, Catholic)
 St. Emily School (K–8, Catholic)
 St. Paul Lutheran Church and School (K–8, Lutheran)

Libraries
 Mount Prospect Public Library

Places of interest
 Randhurst Village
 Mount Prospect Village Hall

Parks and recreation
Multiple park districts serve the town: Mount Prospect, Arlington Heights, Des Plaines, Prospect Heights, and River Trails.

In popular culture 

 In the 1980 movie The Blues Brothers (set in Chicago and vicinity), the car the Blues Brothers ride in is described as being bought at auction from the Mount Prospect Police Department.

A Mount Prospect Police cruiser appears in a season 11 episode of “Comedians in Cars Getting Coffee”, as an homage to Blue Brothers.

Notable people

 John Ankerberg, Christian evangelist.
 Bruce Boxleitner, actor and science-fiction writer, best known for roles in TV series Babylon 5 and Scarecrow and Mrs. King and films Tron and Tron: Legacy; attended Prospect High School
 Ian Brennan, co-creator of Glee and Scream Queens; Prospect High School alumni
 Lee DeWyze, winner of American Idol Season 9; attended Prospect High School
 Thomas C. Kelly, drummer for theChicago Bears & FayRay ; attended Prospect High School
 Brian Gregory, men's basketball coach at University of South Florida, Dayton and Georgia Tech; born in Mount Prospect
 Terry Moran, ABC News Senior National Correspondent; grew up in Mount Prospect and Barrington Hills.
 Dave Kingman, 3-time MLB All-Star outfielder for Chicago Cubs, San Francisco Giants, New York Mets; attended Prospect High School
 Tom Lundstedt, baseball player, (Chicago Cubs, Minnesota Twins); attended Prospect High School
 Phil Masi, baseball player (Boston Braves, Chicago White Sox); died in Mount Prospect
 Timothy Miller, director of PR, Columbus Crew SC; attended St. Raymond School
 Jennifer Morrison, actress (House, Once Upon a Time, Star Trek Into Darkness); attended Prospect High School
 Anson Mount, actor
 Pari Pantazopoulos, professional soccer player (Chicago Fire); attended Prospect High School
 Ed Paschke, highly acclaimed artist, a leader in the Chicago Imagist style; attended Arlington High School
John Ratcliffe, former U.S.  Director of National Intelligence
David J. Regner, Illinois state legislator and businessman; lived in Mount Prospect
Beth Walker, Justice of the West Virginia Supreme Court of Appeals, born in Mount Prospect
Ben Weasel, lead singer and guitarist of band Screeching Weasel
 Karen Zambos, clothing designer; attended Wheeling High School

David Kendziera, US Olympic athlete in the 400m hurdles

References

External links

 Village of Mount Prospect official website
 "Encyclopedia of Chicago" Entry
 Mount Prospect Historical Society
 

 
Chicago metropolitan area
Villages in Cook County, Illinois
Villages in Illinois